Reynolds is a city in Grand Forks and Traill counties in the State of North Dakota. It is part of the Grand Forks, ND-MN Metropolitan Statistical Area or "Greater Grand Forks". The population was 277 at the 2020 census.  Reynolds, named for pioneer settler Dr. Henry Reynolds, was founded in 1881.

Geography
Reynolds is located at  (47.671563, -97.106752).

The southern section of Reynolds is actually in Traill County.

Demographics

2010 census
As of the census of 2010, there were 301 people, 125 households, and 88 families living in the city. The racial makeup of the city was 97.7% White, 0.7% African American, 1.0% Native American, and 0.7% Asian. Hispanic or Latino of any race were 2.3% of the population.

There were 125 households, of which 34.4% had children under the age of 18 living with them, 62.4% were married couples living together, 4.8% had a female householder with no husband present, 3.2% had a male householder with no wife present, and 29.6% were non-families. 29.6% of all households were made up of individuals, and 11.2% had someone living alone who was 65 years of age or older. The average household size was 2.41 and the average family size was 2.98.

The median age in the city was 41.1 years. 24.6% of residents were under the age of 18; 5.6% were between the ages of 18 and 24; 29.6% were from 25 to 44; 29.2% were from 45 to 64; and 11% were 65 years of age or older. The gender makeup of the city was 48.8% male and 51.2% female.

2000 census
As of the census of 2000, there were 350 people, 130 households, and 95 families living in the city. The population density was 525.2 people per square mile (201.7/km). There were 135 housing units at an average density of 202.6 per square mile (77.8/km). The racial makeup of the city was 98.00% White, 0.29% Native American, 0.29% Asian, 0.86% from other races, and 0.57% from two or more races. Hispanic or Latino of any race were 1.14% of the population.

There were 130 households, out of which 39.2% had children under the age of 18 living with them, 69.2% were married couples living together, 0.8% had a female householder with no husband present, and 26.2% were non-families. 24.6% of all households were made up of individuals, and 15.4% had someone living alone who was 65 years of age or older. The average household size was 2.69 and the average family size was 3.21.

In the city, the population was spread out, with 29.4% under the age of 18, 6.3% from 18 to 24, 32.0% from 25 to 44, 18.3% from 45 to 64, and 14.0% who were 65 years of age or older. The median age was 36 years. For every 100 females, there were 90.2 males. For every 100 females age 18 and over, there were 99.2 males.

The median income for a household in the city was $48,750, and the median income for a family was $52,500. Males had a median income of $32,500 versus $21,500 for females. The per capita income for the city was $17,019. None of the families and 1.2% of the population were living below the poverty line, including no under eighteens and 6.1% of those over 64.

Notable people

 Rudolph Hjalmar Gjelsness, born in Reynolds (1894), librarian
 Reuben Harold Tweten, born in Reynolds (1899), farmer and Minnesota state representative

References

External links
 Reynolds City centennial, 1880-1980 : July 11, 12, 13, 1980 from the Digital Horizons website

Cities in Grand Forks County, North Dakota
Cities in Traill County, North Dakota
Cities in North Dakota
Populated places established in 1881
1881 establishments in Dakota Territory